Mark Matthew Herd (born May 29, 1963) is an American community organizer and activist. A member of the Libertarian Party, Herd has run for office three times, most notably as the party's 2016 U.S. Senate nominee.

Early life 
A native of Los Angeles, Herd is a graduate of University High School and the University of Arizona, where he got his bachelor's degree in economics.

Politics 
In 2010, Herd started the Westwood Neighborhood Council, and served 4 years as its councilman.

In 2014, Herd was the Libertarian candidate for California's 33rd congressional district in 2014. 

Herd was also the Libertarian candidate for Senator of California in 2016. 

In 2017, Herd ran against Paul Koretz and Jesse Max Creed for Los Angeles City Council to represent District 5 .

Herd is the founder and Co-Chairman of the Venice Beach Libertarian Club and Executive Producer of the Libertarian Broadcast Network.

References

1963 births
California Libertarians
Living people
People from Los Angeles
University High School (Los Angeles) alumni
University of Arizona alumni